The sixth season of the Russian reality talent show The Voice premiered on September 1, 2017 on Channel One. Dmitry Nagiev returned as the show's presenter. Dima Bilan and Leonid Agutin returned as coaches, while Pelageya returned after two season hiatus alongside Alexander Gradsky who returned after a one-season break. Selim Alakhyarov was announced as the winner of the season, marking Alexander Gradsky's fourth and final win as a coach, and making him the third one-chair turn artist to win, following Dina Garipova in season 1 and Hieromonk Fotiy in season 4. For the first time ever, the final three artists were all male.

Coaches and presenter

On August 13, 2017, Channel One announced that Dima Bilan (his 5th season), Pelageya (her 4th season), Alexander Gradsky (his 5th season), and Leonid Agutin (his 5th season) became coaches in the sixth season.

Dmitry Nagiev returned for his 6th season as a presenter.

Teams
Colour key

Blind auditions
Colour key

Episode 1 (Sep. 1)
The contestants of "The Voice Kids" and the coaches performed "Another Brick in the Wall (Part 2)" at the start of the show.

Episode 2 (Sep. 8)

Episode 3 (Sep. 15)
Note: Basta and Polina Gagarina, former coaches of The Voice, made a special performance with the Eminem's song "Stan" in this episode. Only Leonid turned for them.

Episode 4 (Sep. 22)

Episode 5 (Sep. 29)

Episode 6 (Oct. 6)

Episode 7 (Oct. 13)

The Battles
The Battles round started with episode 8 and ended with episode 11 (broadcast on October 20, 27, 2017; on November 3, 10, 2017). The coaches can steal two losing artists from another coach. Contestants who win their battle or are stolen by another coach will advance to the Knockout rounds.
Colour key

The Knockouts
The Knockouts round started with episode 12 and ended with episode 14 (broadcast on November 17, 24, 2017; on December 1, 2017).
The top 24 contestants will then move on to the "Live Shows."
Colour key

Live shows
Colour key

Week 1: Quarterfinal 1 (December 8)
The first 12 artists of the Top 24 performed on December 8, 2017. The two artists from each team with fewest votes left the competition by the end of the night.

Week 2: Quarterfinal 2 (December 15)
The second 12 artists of the Top 24 performed on December 15, 2017. Two artists from each team with the fewest votes left the competition by the end of the night.

Week 3: Semifinal (December 22)
The Top 8 performed on December 22, 2017. One artist from each team with the fewest votes left the competition by the end of the night.

Week 4: Final (December 29)
The Top 4 performed on December 29, 2017. This week, the four finalists performed two solo cover songs and a duet with their coach.

Reception

Rating

References

The Voice (Russian TV series)
2017 Russian television seasons